The Qatar Investment Authority (QIA) is Qatar's sovereign wealth fund. The QIA was founded by the State of Qatar in 2005 to strengthen the country's economy by diversifying into new asset classes. In 2021, the QIA had an estimated $450 billion of assets.

The QIA's structure and decision-making procedures have been characterized as non-transparent. Spending decisions regarding the fund have been linked to the emir and the prime minister (regardless of whether they sit on the board of the fund). In September 2017, the Research gate (blog post of Berlin) provided data about the functioning behind the Qatar Investment Authority's investments and it was found out that QIA's participation in global capitalism as a fully state-owned business is a compelling and little-examined facet of the organization. By examining fine-grained ownership data, CORPNET can monitor these activities on a worldwide scale. Beyond Sovereign Wealth Funds, any state-owned organization worldwide can be included in this research of cross-border state ownership networks. The data also showcased that there were no noteworthy high-profile transactions when looking at the Qatari state investment outside of the QIA activities; instead, smaller acquisitions with higher, majority, or full ownership targets were discovered. This demonstrates the notion that Qatar's absorption into global capitalism is symbolized by the QIA. The acquisition of PSG, the strong focus on the UK and other European countries as investment targets indicate that the QIA is eager to establish the Qatari state as an important actor in global finance.

History and profile
The QIA was founded in 2005 by the then-emir of Qatar, Hamad bin Khalifa Al Thani, to manage the oil and natural gas surpluses of the government of Qatar. As a result of its stated strategy to minimize risk from Qatar's reliance on energy prices, the fund predominantly invests in international markets (United States, Europe and Asia-Pacific) and within Qatar outside the energy sector. Prior to establishment of the QIA in 2005, Qatar's Ministry of Finance had a small in-house team to invest revenue from budget surpluses. The Qatar National Vision 2030 foresees the shift from natural gas based revenue to QIA-type investments between now and then.

The QIA wholly controls Qatari Diar, a property investment company. The QIA does not publish its holdings to the market.

In June 2013, after the new emir's arrival to power, and a general reshuffle of Qatar's main organizations, Ahmad Al Sayed was appointed as QIA's chairman and chief executive officer, replacing Hamad bin Jassim Al Thani in the post while also remaining managing director and CEO of QIA's main subsidiary, Qatar Holding. Sayed held the post for 16 months. In January 2015, Sheikh Abdullah bin Mohammed bin Saud Al Thani, chairman of Qatari telecommunications company Ooredoo, was appointed as CEO and served until 2018. , Mansoor Bin Ebrahim Al-Mahmoud is the CEO of the company.

The fund is a member of the International Forum of Sovereign Wealth Funds.

Qatar Investment Authority has more than half of its assets invested in private equity and listed shares as it chases higher returns for 2021.

Subsidiaries
Qatar Investment Authority owns 100% of Qatar Holding LLC, and it is associated with Qatar National Bank (50%). QIA is affiliated with Qatar Islamic Bank (16.67%) and with Ubac Curaçao NV (1.35%). QIA is also affiliated with Qatar Sports Investments (QSi).

Investments
In January 2013, one writer pegged the QIA investment in Britain at €30 billion, France at €10 billion and Germany at €5 billion, while another reported that the total assets under management in June 2013 was on the order of $100 billion. Qatar Holding's stake in Barclays rose to 12.7% following Barclays' capital raising in October 2008. Qatar Investment Authority holds a small stake in Fisker Automotive. It also holds about 17% stake in the Volkswagen Group, Porsche, Hochtief, as well as investments in Sainsbury's. The French government has made of Qatar a strategic partner, and the list of partnerships between the two states includes Lagardère (12%) Total (4%), EADS (6%), Technip, Air Liquide, Vinci SA (5%), GDF Suez, Veolia (5%), Vivendi, Royal Monceau, France Telecom and Areva. In February 2009, France accorded special beyond-OECD investment privileges to Qatar and its state-owned enterprises; one example is capital gains exemptions in France. The QIA is also reported to hold part of Xstrata.

On 8 May 2010, Qatar Holding, an indirect subsidiary of QIA, purchased the Harrods Group from Mohamed Al-Fayed, including the Knightsbridge department store. QIA are also the largest shareholder in Sainsbury's. On 3 December 2010, Qatar Investment Authority, along with Colony Capital and Tutor-Saliba Corporation, was part of an investment group known as Filmyard Holdings, which purchased Miramax from Disney.

In February 2012, it completed the acquisition of Credit Suisse's headquarters in London. QIA holds a 6% stake in Credit Suisse and owns shares in Apeldoorn, the majority owner of Canary Wharf Group. Qatari Diar, a property arm of the fund, along with Canary Wharf, won a £300mn deal to redevelop the Shell Centre in London, the former London headquarters of Royal Dutch Shell. The French government has offered tax exemptions for Qatari real estate investments in the country and have acquired almost $4 billion of property. In May 2012, it acquired a stake below 3% in Royal Dutch Shell. It has announced a plan to raise its stake to 7%. In late 2012 Qatar Sports Investments (QSI) completed a buyout of the French football club Paris Saint-Germain F.C. (P.S.G.), which valued the club at $130 million. QSI invested a further $340 million in the club, they had bought the Paris Saint-Germain Handball team the previous year. The Qatari president of P.S.G., Nasser Al-Khelaifi is also the director of Qatari owned television network Al Jazeera Sports, which launched French television channels beIN Sport. Qatar has also offered to finance social programs in French suburbs, which has attracted criticism.

In November 2012, QIA and Cassa Depositi e Prestiti signed the starting agreement of IQ Made in Italy Venture, a four-year cooperation to promote Made in Italy in Qatar's Arabic partners and to push them to invest in Italian economic sectors like fashion, luxury, design, food, tourism, lifestyle & leisure, and defence.

In January 2013, Qatar Holding, an indirect subsidiary of QIA, said it would invest $5 billion into petrochemical projects in Malaysia in three to four years. The investment was said to help Malaysia compete with neighbouring Singapore to become the region's top petrochemical hub. The QIA was planning to invest $200 million in residential property in India through Kotak Realty Fund in late December 2013. In August 2018, Qatar Investment Authority signed Memorandum of Understanding (MoU) to invest up to $500mn in tourism in Indonesia.

In October 2014 Qatar Investment Authority signed an agreement with CITIC Group Corp to launch a $10 billion fund to invest in China The QIA announced its intention to invest $35b in the US during the next five years, starting in September 2015.

Via Mannai Corporation, it is currently in a process of acquiring the French computer science group GFI. In 2021, QIA with its subsidiary unit - Locus Engineering Management and Services Co. W.L.L. is investing in a sub-Saharan African renewable energy platform being led by Enel Green Power.

During the 2021 St Petersburg Economic Forum, Sheikh Tamim bin Hamad Al Thani highlighted Qatar's solid historic relations with Russia and announced that his country will increase investments in the Russian Federation. He also called on Russia's private sector and the world to explore Qatar's promising business environment in many projects and several spheres. In March 2021, QIA became a minority investor in Coveo, the cloud-based search, recommendations, and personalization company.

On 23 January 2023, Qatar Investment Authority has doubled its stake in Credit Suisse Group, becoming the second-biggest shareholder and underlining the growing importance of Middle Eastern investors to the ailing Swiss bank.

Qatari Diar

Qatari Diar is a real estate company established by the Qatar Investment Authority in 2005 with headquarters in Doha.

By 2011 the company had stakes in Vinci SA, a firm employing 183,000 in 100 countries; in the utility Suez Environnement and in Veolia Environnement (4.6%, sold in 2018). That same year Qatari Diar bought the Port Tarraco Marina in Tarragona, Spain.
Early in 2012 the company had 49 projects in the planning or development stage in Qatar and in 29 countries around the world.
The company owns The Shard, a skyscraper in London designed by Renzo Piano and the publicly funded Olympic village also known as East Village, London; and the former Royal Dutch Shell plc headquarters.
In January 2013 it became known that the company had put on hold a redevelopment project of Chelsea Barracks worth around GBP 3 billion. During the same month Qatari Diar pulled out of the bidding for the development of the site of Athens' former international airport Ellinikon.

Mayor Vincent C. Gray (District of Columbia) announced in early 2013 that he will travel to Qatar to promote the flow of global capital to the district. Qatari Diar is said to back CityCenterDC with around US$700 million.
Representatives of Qatari Diar attended an investment conference hosted by the Peruvian Foreign Investment Authority.

Recent developments

Property Investments in London
Canary Wharf Group Investment Holdings, which is majority owned by Qatar Holdings, is London's largest property owner, with almost 21.5m sq ft of space on its books, according to data from the research firm Datscha.

In addition to its investments with Canary Wharf, Qatar Investment Authority owns the site of the Chelsea Barracks, the Olympic Village and The Shard.

Heathrow Airport
Qatar Investment Authority is a major shareholder in Heathrow Airport, holding 20 percent of the airport. In 2017, the company invested a further 650 million pounds ($807 million).

Islamabad Airport
QIA will be taking over Islamabad Airport in Pakistan.

Volkswagen
Bloomberg estimated that in September 2015 Qatar Investment Authority lost $5.9 billion on paper from its stakes in Volkswagen and Glencore after the carmaker admitted to using an illegal software to cheat on emissions tests in the U.S. By holding 17% of Volkswagen's ordinary stock and 13% of preferred shares, Qatar's sovereign-wealth fund is the third largest investor shareholder in the firm.

QIA is also the largest investor in Glencore (8.2%), a mining company.

Barclays
Since 2008 dealings between Qatar Holding LLC and Barclays were investigated by the Serious Fraud Office (SFO) for suspicious cash-raising practices during the global financial crisis. Allegedly, Barclays received €7.5 billion ($8.2 billion) cash injection from QIA's subsidiary but did not inform its shareholders. Barclays was charged with failing to act with integrity and breaching disclosure rules for UK listed companies.

Moreover, in 2011 both the Serious Fraud Office and the Financial Conduct Authority (FCA) investigated Barclays' €2.4 billion ($2.7 billion) secret transaction with a Politically Exposed Person (PEP) from Qatar whose identity remains protected by the financial giant and FCA. In that case, Barclays failed to conduct "due skill, care, and diligence" at the base of Britain's anti-money laundering rules. As a result, the UK financial watchdog meted out a record €92 million ($104 million) penalty against the financial giant.

Upsurge of Qatari investments in New York and D.C.
In early 2015, the QIA announced its intent to "invest $35 billion in the U.S. over the next five years" in various sectors of the economy. Sheikh Abdullah bin Mohammed bin Saud Al Thani, chief executive of QIA, told U.S. officials in December 2016 that it plans to invest $10 billion in infrastructure projects inside the U.S., although he specified no time frame. It is unclear whether this amount is intended to be part of the previously mentioned $35 billion, or if it is a new initiative.

New York
QIA has purchased $3.78 billion in Manhattan properties since 2014, including 111 West 33rd Street, 501 Seventh Avenue and 250 West 57th Street.

QIA owns a 44% stake in its partnership with Brookfield Property Partners on a new mixed-use development delivering in 2019 that will include five separate buildings. In August 2018, Brookfield signed a 99-year lease on Jared Kushner's financially troubled 666 Fifth Avenue skyscraper. The deal raised suspicions that the Qatar Investment Authority, a major investor in Brookfield, was attempting to influence the Trump administration.

In April 2015, the Permanent Mission of the State of Qatar purchased four apartment units for roughly $45 million at a development within the United Nations Plaza.

In January 2014, the Qatari government bought a 20,500-square-foot townhouse for $100 million in Manhattan's Upper East Side, to be redeveloped into its consulate. From 2012 to 2013, Qatar's prime minister at the time, Sheikh Hamad bin Jassim bin Jaber Al Thani, purchased $285 million in apartments in Manhattan.

Washington, D.C.
QIA was one of the major financiers of a recent development known as CityCenterDC, as it invested $650 million into the project.

Controversies

Sunday Telegraph's campaign
In October 2007 the British newspaper Sunday Telegraph launched a two-month long campaign, called "Stop the Funding of Terrorism", to stress Qatar's persistent negligence in countering terrorist finance and actively supporting terrorist entities and enterprises in the Middle East.

The Telegraphs campaign included 34 articles published between 20 September and 16 November 2014, some of which accused Qatar of funding the Islamic State of Iraq and the Levant (ISIL). In November 2017, The Telegraph disclosed that QCUK's chief executive was a former Qatari official who ran an anti-Semitic website instructing Muslims to hate Jews and Christians. QCUK, now called the Nectar Trust, is the British arm of Qatar Charity (QC), a Doha charity which has been designated a proscribed organization by neighboring Gulf states. On 14 June 2020, The Telegraph apologized for claiming the Qatar Charity (QC), as a terrorist organization. The Telegraph admitted that, there is no evidence to support the claim that the Qatar charity or its trustees currently support or have ever funded any terrorist or extremist group. Qatar Charity's categorization as a terrorist organization had "no legal standing in the UK," according to the Charity Commission, which also verified that it has no open cases involving Nectar. We apologized to provide clarification and extend our apologies to Qatar Charity and its trustees for any inconvenience or embarrassment caused.

Middle East Eye found in its investigation that Sunday Telegraphs campaign coincided with efforts by the newspaper owners, David and Frederick Barclay, battling for ownership of three five-star Mayfair hotels Claridge's, The Berkeley and The Connaught. Qatari royal Sheikh Hamad bin Jassim bin Jaber al-Thani was the Barclay brothers' opponent, and he ultimately prevailed when in April 2015 the Qatar Investment Authority adjudicated the purchase of the three London hotels.

The Telegraph denied any allegation of editorial interference by David and Sir Frederick Barclay. Qatar denied the Telegraph's claims. Qatar stated that being a Muslim investment authority did not necessarily mean they supported ISIL.

A statement issued on 11 February 2015 by humanitarian personnel Yahia Sadam belonging to another Sudanese militia Sudan Liberation Movement/Army-Minni Minnawi accused Qatar of supporting "extremism" in the country and claimed it was complicit in the "genocide" by the "scorched earth policy" executed by Sudanese soldiers by means of financial aid channeled through Qatar Charity, Qatar's largest NGO, and especially directed at "building housing complexes in remote and isolated areas to harbor and train extremist groups in Africa and some Arab countries." His statement was issued in the aftermath of alleged operation by Rapid Support Forces which expelled "250,000 villagers", by burning "45 villages" and killing "120" civilians.

The nation agreed to stop supporting the Muslim Brotherhood, expelled Brothers who were not citizens from its territory, and would not shelter any people from GCC countries in order to avoid undermining relations with the Gulf during the period of 2014–2017, when Qatar appeared to be in compliance with counterterrorism and destroying its support to Islamist rebel groups.
The State of Qatar is the second largest donor to the United Nations Trust Fund for Counterterrorism out of a total of 35 other donors, it was revealed on March 27, 2022, during the Fourth High-Level Strategic Dialogue between the State of Qatar & the United Nations Counter-Terrorism Office (UNOCT).

Qatar Islamic Bank (QIB)
Qatar Investment Authority's affiliation with Qatar Islamic Bank (16.67%) raises concerns about the extent to which the sovereign wealth fund's may be or have been involved in some of the bank's activities. In a September 2015 piece, the Consortium Against Terrorist Finance (CATF) discussed the Sharia-compliant financial giant's correspondents and posited that several QIB's correspondents "have controversial histories of affiliation with or support of terrorist or extremist activities". According to US Department of States country reports on terrorism 2019, the Qatari government drafted new AML/CFT legislation, which was finalized and passed into law on September 11, 2019. This legislation included the country forming National Anti-Terrorism Committee. The NATC is tasked with formulating Qatar's Counter Terrorism policy, ensuring inter agency coordination, fulfilling Qatar's obligations to counter terrorism under international conventions, and participating in multilateral conferences on terrorism. According to this reporting, U.S. officials met regularly with the chairman of the NATC to discuss implementation of the CT MOU and overall CT cooperation.

Also, The Qatar State Security Bureau (SSB) maintained an aggressive posture toward monitoring internal terrorism-related activities. Qatar is also a member of the Defeat-ISIS Coalition's CIFG and the TFTC. The country co-hosted a high-level event promoting the power of sport to prevent and counter terrorist radicalization and recruitment on the margins of UN General Assembly in September 2019.

There has also been findings regarding counter terrorism measure taken by Qatar in the report published by United Nations on 27 March 2022, during the Fourth High-Level Strategic Dialogue between the State of Qatar & the United Nations Office of Counter-Terrorism (UNOCT) where the two bodies discussed strategic priorities and collaboration for effective United Nations support to Member States on counter-terrorism. The two sides reaffirmed their strong partnership and discussed opportunities for further collaboration against terrorism. The State of Qatar is the second largest contributor to the United Nations Trust Fund for Counter-Terrorism out of a total 35 other donors.

Among the most concerning QIB's correspondents marked by CATF are: 
 Al Rajhi Bank, which became known to the public for the conspicuous financial support offered by some of its senior officers to al-Qaeda's terrorist cause for decades;
 Islami Bank Bangladesh Limited (IBBL), with an extensive track record of engagements in terrorist finance;
 Jordan Islamic Bank and MashreqBank PSC, both on the 2013 prohibited investment list of the Illinois State Board of Investments.

See also
 Economy of Qatar

References

External links
 
 

 
Financial services companies established in 2005
Government agencies of Qatar
Sovereign wealth funds
Financial services companies of Qatar
2005 establishments in Qatar
Government agencies established in 2005
Government-owned companies of Qatar